First World Hotel & Plaza is a hotel, shopping and entertainment complex located at Resorts World Genting in Genting Highlands, Pahang, Malaysia which consists of a 3-star hotel and a plaza. First World Hotel, Resorts Sdn Bhd, a subsidiary of Genting Malaysia Berhad and Genting Group manages the property.

First World Hotel 

First World Hotel is a 3-star-hotel consisting of 2 towers and has 7,351 rooms. It has held the Guinness World Records title for the largest hotel in the world by the number of rooms since 2015. The hotel previously held the same title in 2006, then having 6,118 rooms in 2 towers, Tower 1 and 2 until The Palazzo took the title after an expansion of The Venetian located on Las Vegas Strip which was officially opened on 1 January 2008. The hotel regained the title after opening a new block named Tower 2 Annex (Tower 2A) with 1,233 rooms. The hotel connects to the brand new shopping mall, SkyAvenue which also houses the Awana Skyway station that links to the Genting Highlands Premium Outlets. First World Hotel is the first hotel in Southeast Asia to launch E-Kiosk or Express Check-in and Check-out kiosks.

First World Plaza 

First World Plaza is a shopping centre located one floor above the lobby level of the hotel on land measured , housing a casino (formerly a pavilion), retail and dining outlets including a Tangs branch, an Indoor Theme Park – Skytropolis Funland and other attractions such as Snow World, Genting Bowl, Seni Kome Peng Heng, Big Top Video Games Park and first Asian branch of virtual reality attraction The VOID which occupies nearly 7000 square feet in the plaza. Before refurbishment from 1 June 2017 to December 2018, it had few attractions in the plaza including a bowling alley, cineplex, "water splash" pool (a warm indoor swimming pool made for mostly young children), Genting International Convention Centre, a pavilion, Haunted Adventure and a Ripley's Believe It or Not! museum.

See also

 Awana Skyway
 Resorts World Genting
 List of largest hotels

References

External links 
 
 First World Hotel's reservation website
 First World Plaza
 First World Hotel photos

Genting Highlands
Hotels in Pahang
Hotel buildings completed in 2008
Shopping malls in Malaysia